The Canadian Premier League Finals is the annual championship game of the Canadian Premier League (CPL), the top level of Canadian soccer. As of the 2021 Final, it is played as a single match hosted by the higher seeded team. The winner is awarded the North Star Shield trophy and from 2023, will earn a berth in the CONCACAF Champions League.

The CPL uses a playoff tournament following the regular season to determine its annual league champion, a method common to every other major North American sports league. This format differs from most soccer leagues around the world, which consider the club with the most points at the end of the season to be the champion.

The inaugural Finals were played as a two-legged tie on October 26 and November 2, 2019 in which Forge FC defeated Cavalry FC. Forge FC is the most successful team in Finals history, winning a second title in 2020 and a third in 2022.

Format
Different formats and methods of qualification have been used for each of the first five CPL seasons.

2019
The 2019 Finals were contested between the winners of the Spring and Fall seasons. The championship was contested as a two-legged tie, with each team hosting one leg at home. The winner was determined by aggregate score but if the aggregate score was tied, the team with the most away goals wins the series. A penalty shoot-out was the final tiebreaker.

2020
The 2020 season saw the end of the split season format, with the 2020 Finals scheduled to be contested between the top-seeded regular season team and the winner of a playoff between the second and third-placed teams. However, as a result of the COVID-19 pandemic, the season format was scrapped and replaced with a single-site tournament with a two-stage regular season. The 2020 Final was contested in a single match between the two top-seeded teams from the four-team second stage.

2021–2022
The 2021 season brought in a new four-team single leg knockout playoff with the two first round winners advancing to the Final. The higher-seeded finalist hosts the single leg game. If a match is tied at the end of normal playing time, extra time is played (two periods of 15 minutes each) and, if necessary, followed by a penalty shoot-out to determine the winners.

Prior to the start of the 2022 season, the league announced that playoff semi-finals would switch to a two-legged format but that the Final would continue to be played as a single match hosted by the higher-seeded team.

2023
Beginning with the 2023 season, five teams will qualify for the playoffs which will use the Page format.

Results

Records and statistics

Finals wins

Champions records in the CONCACAF League
From 2019 until 2021, the CPL champion earned Canada's berth in the following year's CONCACAF League.

Scorers

Trophy
The winning team is presented with the North Star Shield. It is a solid crystal circular shield engraved with the league's logo. The shield sits atop a maple wood base. The winners and finalists are also presented with gold and silver medals respectively.

Venues

Discipline

Yellow card suspensions
Rules concerning yellow card accumulation in regular season and playoff games and its impact on suspensions in the finals have changed over time. In 2019, yellow card accumulation in regular season games resulted in a suspension of Forge FC defender Bertrand Owundi for the first leg of that year's finals. However, when the format changed in 2020, the finals had appeared to have become exempt from suspensions.

The CPL's 2022 Competition Guidelines established that the league's "Championship matches" would be exempt from any yellow card accumulation suspensions and that a fines would replace any suspensions. Although the league later announced changes to yellow card suspensions and their impact on playoffs games on the eve of the 2022 playoffs, this change did not affect the rules for the final.

Red card suspensions
In the final match of the 2019 Canadian Premier League fall season, Dominic Samuel of Forge FC received a red card for two cautionable offences, and was subsequently suspended for the first leg of the Finals.
Forge FC would suffer a similar fate in 2022 when their captain Kyle Bekker was sent off in the second leg of the 2022 CPL semifinals against Cavalry, and prevented him from participating in the Final against Atlético Ottawa.

Players sent-off in the finals

References

Finals
Annual sporting events in Canada
Recurring sporting events established in 2019
Soccer cup competitions in Canada